Gelai Volcano also known as Mount Gelai stands at  tall and is located in Longido District of Arusha Region in Tanzania. The volcano is located in the geographic area know as in the Crater Highlands. It is at the southeastern edge of Lake Natron in the East African Rift. Gelai is the third most prominent peak in Arusha Region and is the 13th highest peak in Arusha region. Volcanic activity on Gelai dates to less than one million years ago. A number of earthquakes occurred in the area in the summer of 2007. Associated with the largest earthquake on 17 July, a NNE-oriented fracture or narrow graben formed on the southern flank of Gelai.

The volcano falls within a game-controlled area that extends east to Longido District, within Arusha Region, where strict regulated hunting is permitted. This has caused an increase in the numbers of animals in the area due to anti poaching efforts provided by revenue from licensed hunters.

See also
List of volcanoes in Tanzania

References

External links

Volcanoes of Tanzania
Geography of Arusha Region
Pleistocene shield volcanoes